Batocerini is a tribe of longhorn beetles of the subfamily Lamiinae.

Taxonomy
The genera that are included in the tribe are:
Abatocera
Apriona
Aprionella
Batocera
Doesburgia
Megacriodes
Microcriodes
Mimapriona
Mimobatocera
Rosenbergia

References

 
Lamiinae